Saint-Jean-sur-Veyle (literally Saint-Jean on Veyle) is a commune in the Ain department in eastern France.

Geography
The Veyle flows northwest through the southern part of the commune.

Population

See also
Communes of the Ain department

References

Communes of Ain
Ain communes articles needing translation from French Wikipedia
Bresse